South Korea (IOC designation:Korea) participated in the 1978 Asian Games held in Bangkok, Thailand from December 9, 1978 to December 20, 1978.

Medal summary

Medal table

Medalists

References

Korea, South
1978
Asian Games